Baal-zephon ( Baʿal Ṣəfōn; Akkadian: Bēl Ḫazi (dIM ḪUR.SAG); Ugaritic: baʿlu ṣapāni; Hurrian: Tešub Ḫalbağe; Egyptian: bꜥr ḏꜣpwnꜣ), was the form of the Canaanite storm god Baʿal ( "The Lord") in his role as lord of Mount Zaphon; he is identified in the Ugaritic texts as Hadad. He was equated with the Greek god Zeus in his form  and later with the Roman .

Because Baʿal Zaphon was considered a protector of maritime trade, sanctuaries were constructed in his honor around the Mediterranean by his Canaanite and Phoenician devotees. "Baal-zephon" thereby also became a placename, most notably a location mentioned in the Hebrew Scriptures' Book of Exodus as the location where the Israelites miraculously crossed the Red Sea during their exodus from Egypt.

God
The name Baʿal Zaphon never appears in the mythological texts discovered at Ugarit. Instead, it occurs in guides to ritual and in letters, where it is used to differentiate this form of Baʿal from others such as Baʿal Ugarit. The earliest discovered depiction of the god—where he stands astride two mountains in a smiting posture—dates to the 18th century BC. Other depictions show him crowned and bearing a scepter. As a protector of maritime trade, his temples also received votive stone anchors. The treaty between Asarhaddon and King Baʿal of Tyre ranks Baʿal Zaphon third behind Baʿal Shamem and Baʿal Malage. In addition to his temple at Jebel Aqra and Ugarit, Baʿal Zaphon is known to have been worshipped at Tyre and Carthage and served as the chief god of the colony at Tahpanes.

A 14th-century letter from the king of Ugarit to the Egyptian pharaoh places Baʿal Zaphon as equivalent to Amun. Temples to Zeus Kasios are attested in Egypt, Athens, Epidauros, Delos, Corfu, Sicily, and Spain, with the last mention occurring on Rome's German border in the 3rd century.

Location
1st-millennium BC Assyrian texts mention Baʿal Zaphon as the name of the mountain itself. (Locally as well, the mountain was worshipped in its own right.)

The books of Exodus and Numbers in the Hebrew Scriptures records that the Israelites were instructed by YHWH to camp across from a place named "Baʿal Zaphon" in order to appear trapped and thereby entice the Pharaoh to pursue them:

Gmirkin identified this as Arsinoe on the Gulf of Suez. A Ptolemaic-era geographical text at the Cairo Museum lists four border fortresses, the third being "Midgol and Baʿal Zaphon". In context, it appears to have been located on a route to the Red Sea coast, perhaps on the canal from Pithom to a location near Arsinoe. On the other hand, David A. Falk has pointed that Baal-zephon is mentioned in Papyrus Sallier IV as an ancient Egyptian place, which was probably located northeast of the Wadi Tumilat.

According to Herodotus (who considered it to mark the boundary between Egypt and Syria), at Ras Kouroun, a small mountain near the marshy Lake Bardawil, the "Serbonian Bog" of Herodotus, where Zeus' ancient opponent Typhon was "said to be hidden". Here, Greeks knew, Baal Sephon was worshipped.

See also
Book of Exodus
Baal

Notes

References

Citations

Bibliography
 .
 .
 .
 .
 .
 .
 .
 . 
 .
 .

External links
Jewish Encyclopedia: Baal-zephon

Torah places
Deities in the Hebrew Bible
Hebrew Bible mountains
Baal
Phoenician mythology
Book of Exodus